The Chevrolet small-block engine is a series of gasoline-powered, V-8 automobile engines, produced by the Chevrolet division of General Motors between 1954 and 2003, using the same basic engine block. Engineer Ed Cole is credited with leading the design for this engine. The engine block and cylinder heads were cast at Saginaw Metal Casting Operations in Saginaw, Michigan.

Generation I and Generation II LT engines are distinct from subsequent LS-based small-block engines. The Generation II engine is largely an improved version of the Generation I, having many interchangeable parts and dimensions. Later generation engines have only the rod bearings, transmission-to-block bolt pattern and bore spacing in common with the Generation I and II engines.

Introduced as a performance engine in 1967, the 350 went on to be employed in both high- and low-output variants across the entire Chevrolet product line.

Although all of Chevrolet's siblings of the period (Buick, Cadillac, Oldsmobile, Pontiac, and Holden) designed their own V8s, it was the Chevrolet  small-block that became the GM corporate standard. Over the years, every GM division in America, except Saturn and Geo, used it and its descendants in their vehicles.

Finally superseded by the Generation III LS in 1997 and discontinued in 2003, the engine is still made by a GM subsidiary in Springfield, MO as a crate engine for replacement and hot rodding purposes. In all, over 100,000,000 small-blocks have been built in carbureted and fuel injected forms since 1955 as of November 29, 2011. The small-block family line was honored as one of the 10 Best Engines of the 20th Century by automotive magazine Ward's AutoWorld.

In February 2008 a Wisconsin businessman reported that his 1991 Chevrolet C1500 pickup had logged over 1 million miles without any major repairs to its small block V8 engine. (Source: The Flint Journal, February 17, 2008).

All Chevrolet small-block V8 engines (Gen I & Gen II) shared the same firing order, 1-8-4-3-6-5-7-2.
All GM corporate small-block V8 engines (Gen III, IV, & V) share a firing order of 1-8-7-2-6-5-4-3.
The 5.5L LT6 engine in the 2023 Corvette Z06 has a firing order of 1-4-3-8-7-6-5-2, due to its use of a flat plane crank.

Overview
The first generation of Chevrolet small-blocks began with the 1955 Chevrolet 265 cu in (4.3L) V8 offered in the Corvette and Bel Air. It quickly gained popularity among stock car racers, nicknamed the "Mighty Mouse", for the then-popular cartoon character, later abbreviated to "Mouse". The 283 was adopted by other Chevrolets, replacing the 265 V8s. From 1954 to 1974, the small-block engine was known as the "Turbo-Fire" or "High Torque" V8. But it was the  series that became the best known Chevrolet small-block. Installed in everything from station wagons to sports cars, in commercial vehicles, and even in boats and (in highly modified form) airplanes, it is the most widely used small-block of all time. Though not offered in GM vehicles since 2003, the 350 series is still in production at a GM subsidiary in Springfield, MO under the company's "GM Genuine Parts" brand, and is also manufactured as an industrial and marine engine by GM Powertrain under the "Vortec" name.

3.750 in. bore family (1955–1957)
All Chevrolet V8s, from the big-blocks to today's LS7 and LS9, evolved from the  small-block family. Of the three engines in this family, two of them, the 265 and the 283, made automotive history. The first of this family was the 265, introduced in 1954. The 265 had a  bore.

265

The  "Turbo-Fire" V8 was the second Chevrolet small-block; the first Chevrolet V8 was produced in 1917.  The 265 cu in Turbo Fire engine was designed by Ed Cole's group at Chevrolet to provide a more powerful engine for the 1955 Corvette than the model's original " Blue Flame" in-line six, the  2-barrel debut version went from drawings to production in just 15 weeks.

Cole's design borrowed the valve train design scheduled to be used at the time in the Pontiac V8. Internal GM rules at the time stated that once an automotive division had introduced a technological innovation, no other GM division could use it for a period of two years. The stud-mounted independent ball rocker arm design patented by Pontiac engineer Clayton Leach, was scheduled for introduction in the Pontiac 1955 V8. GM forced the Pontiac division to share its valvetrain design in Chevrolet's new 265 V8 in 1955, so that both engines were introduced the same year with the same valve train design. A side note to Pontiac's V-8 was the engine was supposed to be introduced on 1953 cars, and all 53 & 54 Pontiac's chassis and suspension were designed for the engine that didn't make it into a Pontiac until late 1954. The reason this happened is that Buick division lobbied the corporation to hold back Pontiac's release because it affected Buick's release of the new OHV Buick V8 engine.

The short-stroke  bore x stroke engine's  bore spacing would continue in use for decades.

Also available in the Bel Air sedan, the basic passenger car version produced  with a two-barrel carburetor.

A shortcoming of the 1955 265 was its lack of any provision for oil filtration built into the block, instead relying on an add-on filter mounted on the thermostat housing, and that was an "option only". In spite of its novel green sand foundry construction, the '55 block's lack of adequate oil filtration leaves it typically only desirable to period collectors.

3.875 in. bore family (1957–1973)
The 283 had a  bore. The 283, famous for being one of the first engines to make one hp per cubic inch, is also famous for being the evolutionary stepping stone that would later give rise to small blocks and to the "W" blocks, ultimately culminating in the Chevrolet big-blocks.

283

The first 283 motors used the stock 265 blocks. However, the overbore to these blocks resulted in thin cylinder walls. Future 283 blocks were cast to accept the 3.875 bore.

Horsepower was up a bit each year for 1958, 1959, and 1960. The 1957 Rochester Ramjet mechanical fuel injection version produced an even one hp per one cu in (an impressive feat at the time. This was the second U.S.-built production V8 to produce one horsepower per cubic inch, after the 1956 Chrysler 300B.

Besides being available in the Chevrolet line, it was optional in Checker Taxis beginning in 1965.
A version of it that was built by GM Canada was also available in Studebaker vehicles produced in Canada for 1965 and 1966.

307
A  version was produced from 1968 through 1973. All 307s had large  journals to accept the 327's crankshaft. Pistons used with the 307 share the same pin height as the 327 but retaining the 283s bore size (prior to 1968 it was possible to stroke a 283 into a 307 where aftermarket pistons had to be used).

1968-1971 Chevrolet Camaro
1968-1973 Chevrolet Chevelle
1968-1969 Chevrolet Impala
1968-1973 Chevrolet Nova
1971-1972 Pontiac Ventura
1972 Chevrolet C10

4.000 in bore family (1962–2002)
Originally intended as the performance block, this engine family through the  became an all purpose engine that saw use in many applications from Corvettes to vans. All engines in this family share the same block dimensions and sometimes even the same casting number; the latter meaning engines were of the same block, but with different strokes (e.g. the casting number 3970010 was used by all three engines: 302, 327, and 350).  This engine family was updated in 1968 for the use of  medium-sized journals. The first engine in this family was the small journal 327 in 1962 and the last being 2000s medium journal 350 in pickup trucks and commercial vehicles. The medium journal 350 was further developed into the Generation II LT1/4 350 in the early 1990s.

302
It was the product of placing the   stroke crankshaft into a  bore  cylinder-block. The 1967 302 used the same crankshaft stroke as the 283, with a forged steel crank that was also produced. DZ 302.

The large-journal connecting rods were thicker (heavier) and used  diameter cap-bolts to replace the small-journal's 11/32. 1968 blocks were made in 2-bolt and 4-bolt versions with the 4-bolt center-three main caps each fastened by two additional bolts which were supported by the addition of thicker crankcase main-web bulkheads. When the journal size increased to the standard large-journal size, the crankshaft for the 302 was specially built of tufftride-hardened forged 1053-steel and fitted with a high-rpm  diameter harmonic balancer. It had a 3/4-length semi-circular windage tray, heat-treated, magnafluxed, shot-peened forged 1038-steel 'pink' connecting rods, floating-pin in '69, forged-aluminum pistons with higher scuff-resistance and better sealing single-moly rings.

Its solid-lifter cam, known as the "30-30 Duntov" cam named after its /0.030 in hot intake/exhaust valve-lash and Zora Arkus-Duntov (the first Duntov cam was the / 1957 grind known as the '097, which referred to the last three digits of the casting number) the "Father of the Corvette", was also used in the 1964-1965 carbureted 327/365 and fuel injected 327/375 engines. It used the '202' / valve diameter high-performance 327 double-hump '186 and 461 heads, pushrod guide plates, hardened 'blue-stripe' pushrods, edge-orifice lifters to keep more valvetrain oil in the crankcase for high-rpm lubrication, and stiffer valvesprings. In 1967, a new design high-rise cast-aluminum dual-plane intake manifold with larger smoother turn runners was introduced for the Z/28 that the /370 hp 1970 LT-1 also used.

1969 Corvette and 1970 Z/28 engines were equipped with a Holley carburetor until the Q-jet carburetor returned in 1973. Unlike the Corvette, the exhaust manifolds were the more restrictive rear outlet 'log' design to clear the Camaro chassis's front cross-member. It had a chrome oil filler tube in the front of the intake manifold next to the thermostat housing from 1967 to 1968. The first year had unique chrome valve covers with Chevrolet stamped into them without an engine displacement decal pad. In 1968, the engine had the chrome covers, but without the Chevrolet name, connected to a PCV valve and a chrome  drop-base open-element air cleaner assembly fitted with a crankcase breather on a  vacuum secondary Holley 4-Bbl carburetor. A 'divorced' exhaust crossover port heated well-choke thermostat coil was used to provide cleaner and faster engine warm-up. Its distributor came in two styles, dual-point (Camaro) and transistorized (Corvette). The dual point had an ignition point cam designed to reduce point bounce at high rpm. Both distributors had a vacuum diaphragm to advance ignition timing at  part-throttle for economy and emissions.

Pulleys for the balancer, alternator, water-pump, as well as optional power steering, were deep-groove to retain the drive belt(s) at high rpm. In 1969, the 302 shared the finned cast aluminium valve covers with the LT-1 350 Corvette engine. In 1968, the last year for factory headers, they had  primaries x  collectors. A stock 1968 Z/28 with the close-ratio transmission, optional transistorized-ignition and 4.88 gear, fitted with little more than the factory cowl plenum cold-air hood induction and headers, was capable of running 12.9 second/  times on street tires.

After the 1967 Trans-Am campaign with the 4-Bbl induction system producing more horsepower than the competing auto makers' 8-Bbl systems, for 1968 Chevrolet developed a factory 'cross-ram' aluminum intake-manifold package using two Holley  mechanical secondary carburetors for Trans-Am racing. It was available only as off-road service parts purchased over the Chevrolet dealership parts counter. Chevrolet went so far as to carry the positive crankcase ventilation system (PCV) over to the cross-ram induction system to retain emissions compliance mandated for US-produced cars beginning in 1967, that also provided full-throttle crankcase pressure venting to the intake air to burn its vapors.

Engines prepared for competition use were capable of producing  with little more than the 8-Bbl induction, ported heads with higher pressure valvesprings, roller rocker arms, and the '754 2nd-design road-race cam. 1967/1968 models' cowl-induction system had an enclosed air-cleaner assembly ducted from its passenger side into the firewall cowl above the heater core.

In 1969, factory Z/28's could be ordered with the ZL-1 aluminum-block 427 adaption of the 1967 L-88 427 Corvette cowl-induction 'ZL-2' hood available for both single and dual four-barrel induction systems that were sealed to the air cleaner base ensuring dense cooler, high-pressure, oxygen-laiden air from the center of the base of the windshield was supplied to the engine for combustion smoothness and maximum power production.

Another popular service-parts-only component used on the 302 was the magnetic-pulse Delco transistor-ignition ball bearing distributor. Introduced in 1963 on Pontiac's  drag racing engines, General Motors fitted it to the 1967 Z/28 before they used it on the L88  Corvette. It eliminated the production breaker-point ignition allowing greater spark energy and more stable ignition timing at all engine speeds including idle. This was one of the least talked about yet most transformative and comprehensive performance and durability upgrades of its time. Many of the 302s off-road service parts were the development work of racers like Roger Penske. Every part in a SCCA Trans-Am engine had to be available through local Chevrolet parts departments to encourage their use by anyone who wanted them.

While the 302 became a strong Limited Sportsman oval track racing engine in the hands of racers like Bud Lunsford in his 1966 Chevy II, its bore/stroke and rod/stroke geometries made it a natural high-rpm road-racing engine and were responsible for its being among the more reliable production street engines homologated for full competition across all the American makes, winning back-to-back Trans-Am Championships at the hands of Mark Donohue in 1968 and 1969. However, with engines built by Al Bartz, Falconer & Dunn and Traco Engineering, the pinnacle of the 302's use in professional racing was its being the primary engine that powered the outstanding but overshadowed 1968-1976 Formula 5000 Championship Series, a SCCA Formula A open-wheel class designed for lower cost.

The engine was also popular in Formula 5000 racing around the world, especially in Australia and New Zealand where it proved more powerful than the Repco-Holden V8.

Reminiscing about the series, mid-70s Australian F5000 driver Bruce Allison said, "We never used first gear at the start. We started in second, and even then there was so much torque, you'd get wheelspin through third and fourth gears." Prepared with a Lucas-McKay mechanically timed individual-stack magnesium fuel-injection induction system that was paired with ported production car double-hump iron heads, a rev-kit fitted roller lifter camshaft, roller bearing rocker arms, and a virtually stock production crankshaft, it had a lasting impact on the series' ability to conduct high car-count finishes and close competition events by the degree of mechanical success it provided to a series filled with star international Grand Prix drivers like David Hobbs, Brian Redman, Jody Scheckter and Mario Andretti.

327

The  V8, introduced in 1962, had a bore of 4.00in and 3.25in stroke. Power ranged from  depending on the choice of carburetor or fuel injection, camshaft, cylinder heads, pistons and intake manifold. In 1965 Chevrolet released the now-legendary L-79, which was nothing more than an L-76 (11.0:1 forged pop-up pistons, forged steel rods and crank, 2.02 Corvette heads), but with the 30-30 Duntov cam replaced by the No. 151 hydraulic cam.

In 1966, Checker began offering the 327 as an option. The Avanti II and its successors were powered by the 327 and later versions of the small-block V8.

The 327 was fitted in the English Gordon-Keeble. 99 cars were made between 1964 and 1967. It was also installed in many Isos, until 1972 when General Motors started demanding cash in advance and the Italian manufacturer switched to the Ford Cleveland V8.

In 1968, the 327 L73 developing  was part of the CKD packages exported to Australia from Canada for use in the locally assembled (by General Motors Holdens) Chevrolet Impala and Pontiac Parisienne. GMH used the same specification engine in the Holden HK Monaro GTS327. The engine was used in the Monaro GTS327 to make it the new Holden Muscle Car, and so it could compete in the local improved production (Australian Group C). The car had modified suspension just before release to also be used in local Series Production racing (Australian Group E). A special build 327 was built for GMH for the final run of the HK GTS327 by the Canadian McKinnon Industries. It was a lower compression version of the 1968 engine first used on the HK GTS327, and was dressed as a 1969 engine sporting all 1969 parts. The 327 was replaced in the mid 1969 HT Monaro by the 350 L48 developing .

350

The , with a  stroke, first appeared as a high-performance L-48 option for the 1967 Camaro. One year later it was made available in the Chevrolet Nova, and finally in 1969 the rest of the Chevrolet line could be ordered with a 350. As had been the case with earlier versions of the small-block, the 350 was available in the Beaumont sold by Pontiac Canada, which unlike its US counterparts, used Chevrolet chassis and drivelines.

Many variants followed.

L46
Years: 1969-1970

The L46 became an optional engine for the 1969 Chevrolet Corvette. It was a higher performance version of the base  V8 with casting number 186  valve heads and had an 11.0:1 compression ratio requiring high octane gas and produced (SAE gross power). It was also available in 1970 with 4bbl Quadrajet carburetor and L46 hydraulic cam, dome piston (+), 186 heads, and a four-bolt block.

L48
Years: 1967–1980

The L48 is the original , solely available for 1967 in the Super Sport (SS) version of Camaro (1967-up) or Chevy II/Nova in 1968–1979. In 1969 it was used in almost all car lines; Camaros, Caprices, Impalas, El Caminos, Chevelles & Novas. The 1969 L48s use a hydraulic cam, 4bbl Quadrajet carburetor, cast pistons, 4-bolt main casting number 010 Blocks & casting number 041 or 186 heads. Power output was  SAE and  torque. Compression ratio was 10.25:1. The compression ratio of the L48 was lowered to 8.5:1 in 1971.

In 1972 the L48 (4bbl V8) option for the Nova was part of the SS package. This is indicated by the fifth digit in the VIN being a K. Nineteen seventy-two was the only year the SS package could be verified by the VIN.

The L48 engine was exported to Australia, where it appeared in the Holden Monaro from 1969 through 1974, and in the Statesman from 1971 through 1974. Towards the end of the HQ series in 1973–74, due to US emissions regulations, the performance of these engines had dropped to the same or lower than Holden's locally manufactured  V8, which was not yet subject to similar regulations, so Holden discontinued using the engine.

The L48 V8 was the standard engine in the 1975–1980 Chevrolet Corvette. The L48 V8 Corvette engine produced  in 1975.

L65
The 1970 model year Camaro had a 250HP High Performance 2bbl Rochester carburetor. In 1971, it dropped to 245HP; 1972 it had 165 net HP, while 1973-1975 had 145 net HP. It was basically the 2bbl version of the L48 350. It was produced until the 1976 model year. It had 255 lb/ft (346 nm) of torque.

LM1
The LM1 is the base 350 cu in with a 4-barrel carburetor (usually with a Rochester Quadrajet)  engine in passenger cars to 1979 as a retail option (its final use in a retail passenger car was the 1981 Camaro Z28) and police package 9C1 A/G (Malibu to 1981) and B-bodies (Caprice, Impala) until 1988 retail market GM rear wheel drive/V8s sold to the general public had a maximum 5.0 liters displacement with the exception of its muscle car survivors e.g. Corvette and F-bodies (Camaro IROC Z or Trans Am). Throughout its lifespan, it used mechanical ignition points, electronic, or computer-controlled spark system, and conventional or feedback carburetors.
The LM1 was superseded by the L05 powerplant after 1988. The LM1 was first introduced for 1969 model year as a 9.0:1 255 hp engine. It was essentially an L48 engine in all ways except for 75cc combustion chambers rather than the L48's 64cc, and less spark advance to allow it to run on regular grade fuel. It was replaced at the end of December 1968 by the L65 and re-appeared again in the 1970's. This engine was fitted to automatic versions of the 1969 and 1970 Holden Monaro GTS350 in Australia where it was rated at 275 hp most likely due to the use of higher octane fuel and far more spark advance than was fitted to North American versions of the engine.

ZQ3
Years: 1969-1974

The ZQ3 is the standard engine in the 1969–1974 Chevrolet Corvette.

In 1969 and 1970 it was a  version of the  small-block, with 10.25:1 compression and hydraulic lifters. It used a Rochester "4MV" Quadra-Jet 4-barrel carburetor and a L48 camshaft.

Post-1971 blocks possibly had a lower nickel content but thicker cylinder deck, and post 1974 heads of the small block Chevrolet used less iron, and were lighter weight, crack-prone, and were less powerful because of the lower compression ratios used.

LT-1

Years: 1970–1972

The LT-1 was one of the most well-known SBC V8s becoming available in 1970. Redline was 6,500 rpm but power fell off significantly past 6,200 rpm. The LT-1 was available in the Corvette and Camaro Z28.

L82
Years: 1973–1980

Its cast-aluminum LT-1 valvecovers were painted crinkle-black contrasting with the aluminum manifold and distributor housing. It produced  in the Corvette for 1976–1977. This engine was also available on the Chevrolet Camaro in 1973 and 1974.

L81
Years: 1981

The L81 was the only  Corvette engine for 1981. The L81 was the first Corvette engine to employ a "smart carburetor." The 1980 Rochester Quadrajet was modified to allow electronic mixture control, and an ECM (Engine Control Module) supplied with data from an exhaust oxygen sensor, modified the fuel-air mixture being fed to the engine.

LS9
Years: 1969-1986

The LS9 was GM's 350 cubic inch truck engine used in C/K/G 10/20 models under  GVWR (gross vehicle weight rating). A version using a closed-loop carburetor was used with the California emissions package in its final years. The LS9 and LT9 engines were replaced for 1987 by the L05 TBI (throttle-body fuel injection) engines. Most of the small block engines in this timeframe were built at either the Flint engine plant in south Flint, Michigan or at St. Catharines, Ontario. The Flint plant was producing about 5,200 engines per day in the mid-1980s, and had a slower, separate line for the TPI engines used in the Camaro and Corvette. (Source: 1984 Chevrolet Truck Data Book.)

LT-9
Years: 1981-1986

The LT-9 served as GM's truck-based heavy emissions variant of the  supplied in K20/K30 pickups, G model passenger and cargo vans (built in Lordstown, OH and later in Flint, MI)  and with the P30 chassis used for motorhomes and stepvans.

LT-9's were carbureted with Rochester Quadrajets from factory and are generally 4-bolt mains. The LT-9 is often known by VIN code as the "M-code 350."

L83
Years: 1982, 1984

Since GM did not assign a 1983 model year to production Corvettes, there was no L83 for 1983. The L83 added "Cross-Fire" fuel injection (twin throttle-body fuel injection).

L98

Years: 1985–1992

The new 1985 L98 350 added tuned-port fuel injection "TPI", which was standard on all 1985–1991 Corvettes. Aluminum cylinder heads (Corvette only) were released part way through the 1986 model run, modified for 1987 with D-ports, and continued through the end of L98 Corvette production in 1991 (still used on ZZx 350 crate engines until 2015 when the ZZ6 received the fast burn heads). The L98 V8 was optional on Jan. '87–'92 Chevrolet Camaro & Pontiac Firebird models (rated at - and -)
The 1987 versions had  and  more and a change to hydraulic roller camshaft. Compression was up again in 1990 to 9.5:1 Camaro/Firebird and 10:1 Corvettes, but rated output stayed the same.

Vehicles using the L98:
1985-1991 Chevrolet Corvette
1987-1992 Chevrolet Camaro (optional)
1987-1992 Pontiac Firebird (optional)

L05
The L05 was introduced in 1987 for use in Chevrolet/GMC trucks in the GMT400 (introduced in April 1987 as 1988 models) and the R/V series trucks such as the K5 Blazer, Suburban, and rounded-era pickups formerly classed as the C/K until 1991 which includes chassis cabs and 4-door crew cabs. The L05 was also used in the G van models and the P30 step vans. Additionally, the L05 was used in 9C1-optioned police package Caprices, and in the following vehicles:

1992/1993 Buick Roadmaster sedan and station wagon
1990–1992 Cadillac Brougham (optional engine)
1993 Cadillac Fleetwood
1989-1993 Chevrolet Caprice 9C1 police package (roller cam); 1A2-optioned special service station wagon
1992/1993 Chevrolet Caprice wagon (optional engine)
1993 Chevrolet Caprice LTZ
1992 Oldsmobile Custom Cruiser wagon (optional engine)
1991-1994 GMC W4500 Tiltmaster / Isuzu NPR gas
1995-1996 AM General Hummer H1

L05s were used primarily with casting number 14102193 (64cc combustion chambers) cylinder heads with swirled intake ports - the intake ports were designed for fuel economy (the design was also shared with the 103 heads used on the 4.3L with TBI). The swirl ports (known to GM as a vortex chamber) along with the irregular shape of the combustion chambers limit the airflow and horsepower output where they did not provide a fast burn, later phased in with the 1996 Vortec heads. A majority of the L05s used with the trucks and vans had conventional flat tappet camshafts, while the Caprice 9C1 (1989–93) had a roller cam. L05 usage was replaced by the LT1 after 1993 in GM B-Bodies and D-Bodies until production ceased in 1996.

A single belt (serpentine belt) accessory drive was introduced on the L05, the 5.0L L03 and the 4.3L V6 LB4 engines used in the 1988 GMT400 models but not on the older R/V models (R/V models received the serpentine belt drive in 1989 when the front grille was facelifted in appearance to the GMT400 lineup). In mid-1996 the L05 was equipped with heads used in the 1996 G30. In February 2008, a Wisconsin businessman reported that his 1991 Chevrolet C1500 pickup had logged over 1 million miles without any major repairs to its L05 engine.  (Source: The Flint Journal, February 17, 2008)  The article also mentioned that the Flint engine plant that built the engine, had produced 45 million engines in its 45-year history, before closing in 1999.

L31
The Vortec 5700 L31 (VIN code 8th digit "R") is a 5.7L V8 truck engine. It is Chevrolet's last production Generation I small-block. The cylinder heads feature combustion chambers and intake ports very similar to those of the LT1 V8, but lacking the LT1's reverse-flow cooling and higher compression. As such, the L31 head is compatible with all older small-blocks, and is a very popular upgrade. It offers the airflow of more expensive heads, at a much lower cost. It does, however, require a specific intake manifold (A 5.7L, 350 CI L31, Vortec engine has eight bolts attaching the intake manifold or four per head, as opposed to the "traditional" six bolts per head; twelve in total found on older Chevrolet small blocks). Chevrolet's L31 was replaced by GM's 5.3L LM7 V8. Known as the GEN 1+, the final incarnation of the 1954 era-vintage small block ended production in 2005 with the last vehicle being a Kodiak/Topkick HD truck. It is still in current production as a crate engine for marine applications and automotive hobbyists as the 'RamJet 350' with minor modifications. Volvo Penta and Mercury Marine also still produce the L31. The "Marine" intake, despite its cast iron construction, is an L31 upgrade that allows use of common Bosch-style injectors with various flow rates while still maintaining emission compliance.

 1996–1999 Chevrolet/GMC C/K full-size trucks
 1996–1999 Chevrolet Suburban/GMC Suburban full-size long-wheelbase SUVs
 1996–2000 Chevrolet Tahoe/GMC Yukon (and 2000 Tahoe Limited, 2000 Tahoe Z71, 2000–mid-2003 Sonora models) full-size short-wheelbase SUVs
 1999–2000 Cadillac Escalade
 1996–2002 Chevrolet Express/GMC Savana full-size vans

TBI L31 applications
 1996 G-Series vans over  GVW w/ 4L80E transmission

Special applications
 Oscar Mayer Wienermobile
 1995-2003 GMC W4500 Tiltmaster / Isuzu NPR gas

4.125 in bore family (1970–1980)

400

The  is the only engine in this family and was introduced in 1970 and produced for 10 years. It has a  bore and a  stroke. The 400 differed from other small blocks in that the cylinders were siamesed and therefore required 'steam' holes in the block, head gaskets, and heads to help alleviate 'hot-spots' in the cooling system at the point above the siamesed cylinders. Overheating and damage are likely if head gaskets or heads without 'steam' holes are used on a 400 block. The 400 is the only engine that uses a  main bearing journal and a  rod bearing journal. The connecting rod was also 400 specific being  as opposed to the  rod used in all other small block Chevrolet engines. The 400 was made in 4-bolt main journal from 1970 to 1972 and in 2-bolt main journal from 1973 to 1979. The 400 can have either 2 or 3 freeze-plugs per side though all 400 blocks have the provisions for a 3rd freeze-plug on each side. The 400 was rated at  gross ( SAE net) through its life. The 400 saw extensive use in full-size Chevrolet and GMC trucks; K5 Blazer/Jimmy, 1/2-ton, 3/4-ton, 1-ton, and even larger 'medium duty' trucks had an option to be equipped with a 400. The engine was available in midsize A-Body and full-size B-Body passenger cars until the end of the 1976 model year. Early models produced  with a two-barrel carburetor. All 400s came with a two-barrel carburetor until 1973. A four-barrel carburetor option became available in 1974.

It was also used for the limited production Avanti for a few years in the 1970s.

3.671 in bore family (1975–1976)

262
The 1975–1976 262 was a  90° pushrod V8 with an iron block and heads. The 262 was replaced with the 305 for the 1977 model year.

This was Chevrolet's second 4.3 L-displacement power plant; four other Chevrolet engines displaced 4.3 L: the Vortec 4300 (a V6 based on the Chevrolet , with two cylinders removed), the original  V8 in 1954, a bored version of the stovebolt-era 235 inline six displacing , and a derivative of the Generation II LT engines known as the L99 (using the 305's  bore, -long connecting rods, and a  stroke).

This engine was used in the following cars:
1975–1976 Chevrolet Monza
1975 Chevrolet Nova
Early 1977 Pontiac Ventura

3.736 in bore family (1976–1998)

305
Designed and built during the era of the gas embargo, CAFE mandates, and tighter emissions, this engine family was designed to become Chevrolet's cost-effective, all-purpose "economy V8" engine line. It was intended to fill the gap where the venerable 283 and 307 had been. This new engine family would provide better gas economy than the 350, share its basic architecture and many parts with the 350 (thus reducing production costs), and provide customers with more horsepower and torque than Chevrolet's 1970s-era inline 6 and V6 engines. During the early 1980s, when GM was streamlining their engine lineups, the Chevrolet 305 would rise to prominence as General Motors' "corporate" engine, signified by being the standard (and often only) V8 in many GM vehicles. Through much of the 80's, the 305 became General Motors' most common V8, followed closely by Oldsmobile's 307. The 305 also became the standard V8 in GM's C/K truck series, and was even used in the Corvette for California in 1980.

Crankshafts used with the 305 had the same casting number as the 350 with one discernible difference - the 305 crank is lighter in weight to compensate for engine balancing. As a result, the counterweights are smaller, which makes it unsuitable for use in a 350 where metal would have to be welded back on. The medium journal 305, like its big-brother 350, would be further developed in the 1990s, although with a reduced  stroke using  connecting rods, into the Generation II LT engine L99 263.
1976–1992 Chevrolet Camaro
1977–1993 Chevrolet Caprice 
1977-1985 Chevrolet Impala
1980 Chevrolet Corvette (California only)
1976–1988 Chevrolet Malibu, Chevrolet El Camino/GMC Caballero, and Chevrolet Monte Carlo
1976–1979 Chevrolet Monza
1976–1979 Chevrolet Nova (also GM X-body clones after 1976)
1977–2003 Chevrolet/GMC Trucks, SUVs, Vans
1978–1987 Buick Regal
1975–1979 Buick Skylark
1991–1992 Cadillac Brougham
1977–1981 Checker Marathon
1991–1992 Oldsmobile Custom Cruiser
1977      Oldsmobile Omega
1978–1980 Oldsmobile Cutlass (U.S. market only, Canadian market 1978–1987)
1977–1981 Pontiac Catalina (B-body)
1977–1981 Pontiac Bonneville (B-body)
1982–1986 Pontiac Bonneville (G-body)
1977–1992 Pontiac Firebird
1981–1987 Pontiac Grand Prix
1978–1981 Pontiac Grand LeMans (A/G-body, includes Grand Am)
1982–1986 Pontiac Parisienne (B-body)
1982–1986 Pontiac Parisienne Safari (B-body wagon)
1979 Pontiac Sunbird

The Chevrolet 305 is a reliable, fuel efficient V8, easily capable of 200,000 miles, if maintained. From 1976 onward into the early 1980s, these engines were prone to wearing out their camshaft lobes prematurely due to a combination of improper manufacturing and poor quality controls (a result of GM cost-cutting measures). The 305 is sometimes dismissed in performance circles because of its lackluster performance, small bore size, and difficulty flowing large volumes of air at high RPM. However, two variants of the 1983 to 1992 305 were notable performers: the 1983 to 1988 L69 High Output 5.0L (only used in late 1983 to early 1986 F-body and late 1983 to 1988 Monte Carlo SS) and the 1985 to 1992 LB9 Tuned Port Injection 5.0L (F-body only).

After 1993, its usage was limited to light trucks and SUVs until the 2000 model year while vans and commercial vehicles continued until 2003. The 305 was sold as a crate motor under the Mr. Goodwrench brand as a replacement motor and as a boat engine for Mercury Marine until late 2014 when it was discontinued. The cylinder block is still in production by GM (part number 10243869) for Sprint Car Spec Racing.

LG3

The first iteration of the 305, the LG3 was introduced in 1976. This variant used a Rochester 2GC carburetor from 1976 to 1978. In 1979, the more fuel-efficient Rochester Dual-Jet 2bbl carburetor replaced the older 2GC. All years had an 8.5:1 compression ratio. It was discontinued in 1982.

LG4
Introduced in 1978, the LG4 was essentially an LG3 with the addition of a 4-bbl carburetor and larger valves. The engine saw a series of gradual improvements, increasing reliability, mpg, and power output through its production run. In 1981 (1980 for California models) Chevrolet added GM's new "Computer Command Control" (CCC) engine management system to the LG4 engines (except Canadian models). The CCC system included the electronic Rochester 4-bbl E4ME Quadra-Jet, with computer-adjusted fuel metering on the primary venturis and a throttle position sensor allowing the CCC to calculate engine load. In the ignition system, CCC was fully responsible for the timing curve; mechanical and vacuum advances were eliminated from the distributor. The more precise spark timing provided by the CCC made possible a series of increases in compression ratio from a pre-CCC 8.4:1, to 8.6:1, to a knock-sensor-assisted 9.5:1, all while still only requiring 87 AKI regular unleaded fuel.

In 1983, Chevrolet replaced the cast-iron intake with an aluminum version and used either 14014416 ("416") or 14022601 ("601") heads with 1.84 inch intake valves, 1.50 inch exhaust valves, 58 cc chambers, and 178 cc runners. For 1985, the 4-valve-relief, flat top pistons from the L69 were added to the LG4, which resulted in another increase in compression. Also added was a knock sensor to allow the "CCC" engine management system to compensate for the increase in compression and a more aggressive spark-timing map in the ECM. For 1986, Chevrolet changed over to a one-piece rear main seal engine block design to minimize leaks and warranty claims; however, some early 1986 blocks retained a two-piece rear main seal.

For 1987, Chevrolet once again made some revisions to increase overall reliability, many of them borrowed from the TBI L03, which was to replace the LG4. The coil-in-cap HEI distributor was retired, and an all-new electronic distributor design was used. The intake manifold to head bolt pattern was redesigned to improve gasket integrity - four of the center intake manifold bolts were drilled at 72 degrees instead of 90 degrees for the cast iron cylinder heads. Changes to the valve covers were also made. Ribbing was added to the top of the valve covers to increase surface area, acting as a heat sink. To improve intake gasket sealing, the mounting bolts were relocated to the valve cover centerline, placing all sealing pressure evenly upon the mounting flange perimeter. Thus, these became known as centerbolt valve covers, first introduced in 1985 on the LB4 4.3L V6 and the Corvette a year earlier (the aluminum cylinder heads used with the Corvette were the first to have the centerbolt valve covers). Another improvement was use of a hydraulic lifter/roller camshaft on most 1987 LG4s. Some early engines have lifter retainer provisions, but use the older, non-roller camshaft. 1987 would also be the last year for the LG4 production, however a run of LG4 engines was made to supplement the carry-over production for the 1988 Monte Carlo and the 1988 Chevrolet Caprice.

LU5
Years: 1982 – 1984

The LU5 "Crossfire EFI 5.0L" featured a dual Throttle Body Injection set-up, based upon the original "Crossram Intake" supplied by Chevrolet for the 1969 Camaro Z28. Unlike, the original '69 version, Chevrolet did not place it in the trunk for owners to install. The system used a special version of GM's still-new "CCC" engine management system. Fuel was supplied by the two TBI units, set diagonally apart from each other, atop the unique, aluminum intake manifold. Unfortunately, the system was placed atop the basic LG4 and lacked any significant performance capability. The engine was originally planned for the long-awaited '82 Camaro Z28, however due to a last-minute GM-mandated cancellation of Pontiac's 301 V8 production & Turbo 4.9L Project (T301), the Crossfire 305 was made available in the '82 Trans Am. A 350 cubic inch version was also used in the Corvette from 1982 to 1984. Since it was fairly early into GM's electronic engine management development and electronic fuel injection programs, few dealerships had the technology, equipment, or properly trained mechanics capable of dealing with these engines. These problems were compounded by widely varying fuel quality standards, production issues, poor quality control by GM, & owners who tinkered with a system they did not understand. In a very short time, these engines obtained the notorious nickname; "Ceasefire Engine". Today, owners with these engines note that they are fairly reliable, and that a significant upgrade can be made by simply using the L69/LB9 TPI/L98 TPI exhaust manifolds/ exhaust systems... When combined with performance-built stock 305 heads w/larger valves or aftermarket heads, plus a camshaft upgrade, these engines can perform surprisingly well. Thanks mostly to a somewhat cult-like following, a number of aftermarket performance parts are also available through Crossfire-specialized manufacturers.

L69

Years: late-1983 – 1988

The L69 High Output 5.0L was released late into the 1983 model year. It was optional in the Firebird Trans Am, Camaro Z28, and IROC-Z, and was standard in the revived Monte Carlo Super Sport.

The L69 features a compression ratio of 9.5:1 and a relatively aggressive stock camshaft. It also uses a performance-tuned CCC ECM/PROM, a knock sensor, a performance-tuned E4ME  Rochester Quadra-Jet 4 barrel carburetor, and a special, free-flowing exhaust system with large diameter exhaust manifolds, Y-pipe and catalytic converter.

The L69 F-body exhaust system components would be revised slightly and used again on the later LB9 305 and L98 350 TPI engines. Additionally, the engines came equipped with a functional cold air induction hood on the 1983-1984 Trans Am, a dual snorkel air cleaner assembly on the 1983-1986 Camaro Z28 and IROC-Z and 1985-1986 Trans Am, a large, single snorkel on the 1983-1988 Monte Carlo SS (also, rare optional dual snorkel in 1987-1988), an aluminum intake manifold, high stall torque converter on the Monte Carlo SS and 1984 F-bodies, or a lightweight flywheel on T-5 equipped F-bodies.

LE9

Years: 1981–1986

The LE9  was a truck/van/car version 4BBL  that also had a 9.5:1 compression ratio, the LM1 cam and 14010201 casting heads featuring 1.84/1.50" valves and  chambers.

LB9

Years: 1985–1992

The LB9 "Tuned Port Injection 5.0L" was introduced in 1985. At its core was the stout L69 shortblock and it used the same aggressive L69 camshaft profile. The induction system was unlike any system used previously by GM. It featured a large plenum made of cast aluminum, with individual runners made of tubular aluminum, feeding air to each cylinder. And each cylinder had its own fuel injector fed by a fuel rail mounted above each bank. In 1985, this engine was optional only in the Camaro Z28, IROC-Z and Trans Am equipped with the WS6 performance suspension. The LB9 was also available in the '87-92 GTA and Firebird Formula.

L03
Years: 1987–95

This engine used the TBI throttle body fuel injection, which was a hybrid between EFI and carburetor technology. It used an EFI system with electronically controlled injectors, which were mated to a twin barrel "carburetor" body. It featured "swirl port" heads (helped emissions, but severely stunted power output) and served as the base V8 engine in all C/K 1500 Series GMC/Chevrolet Trucks/Vans. It was also very common in Firebirds and Camaros because it was the only engine that offered a 5 speed manual combination. The 350 exceeded the Borg-Warner T5's input power ratings, and as such, it was cut from the 350 cars to prevent lemon law and warranty losses.

The L03 used hydraulic roller lifters, which allowed it to recover some of the lost horsepower from its factory design, while further increasing efficiency (reduced rotational drag). Despite downfalls in its aspiration restrictions, the L03 had one thing going for it: reliability (87-90 F-bodies that carry the L03 did not use a rev limiter). They used dished pistons with a 9.3:1 to 9.5:1 compression ratio The L03 TBI featured a 3.736" bore and 3.48" stroke, the same as its TPI cousin, the LB9.

L30
Years: 1996-2003

The Vortec 5000 L30 is a V8 truck engine. Displacement is 5,020 cc, (305.4 cubic inches). The compression ratio is 9.1:1. It is based on the Generation I small-block from Chevrolet. It was replaced by the 4.8 L Vortec 4800 LR4 for the 2003 full-size vans. In C/K truck configuration it produces  net flywheel at 4,600 rpm and   net flywheel torque at 2,800 rpm. In van configuration it produces  net flywheel at 4,600 rpm and    net flywheel torque at 2,800 rpm. The engine uses a hydraulic roller cam and high flowing, fast burn style vortec heads. Differences include bore and stroke, intake valve size, and smaller combustion chambers.
L30 applications:
 Chevrolet Express/GMC Savana
 General Motors C/K full-size trucks

3.50 in bore family (1979–1982)

267
The 267 was introduced in 1979 for GM F-body (Camaro), G-bodies (Chevrolet Monte Carlo, El Camino, and Malibu Classic) and also used on GM B-body cars (Impala and Caprice models).

It was only available with a M2ME Rochester Dualjet 210 – effectively a Rochester Quadrajet with no rear barrels. After 1980, electronic feedback carburetion was used on the 267. The 267 also saw use in 1980 to 1982 Checker Marathons.

While similar in displacement to the other  V8 engines produced by General Motors (including the Oldsmobile 260 and Pontiac 265), the small bore 267 shared no parts with the other engines and was phased out after the 1982 model year due to inability to conform to emission standards.

Power output would drop in subsequent years of the engine. The  had a low 8.3:1 compression ratio.

Major changes
The original design of the small block remained remarkably unchanged for its production run, which began in 1954 and ended, in passenger vehicles, in 2003. The engine is still being built today for many aftermarket applications, both to replace worn-out older engines and also by many builders as high-performance applications. The principal changes to it over the years include:

1956 – Full-flow oil filtration was introduced, using a paper element filter in a canister that was mounted to a boss that was added to the left rear cylinder block casting and machined for this purpose.
1957 – The displacement of the base V8 continued at 265 cubic inches, but optional V8 engines were introduced with a displacement of 283 cubic inches.
1958 – Bosses for side motor mounts were added to the block casting, used for production mounts for this and all future model years.  However, the features for front motor mounts as used in 1955–1957 remained part of the block casting in this and future years.  The 265-cubic-inch version of the engine was discontinued.  Also, the cylinder head valve cover mounting bolt holes were changed from the top row staggered (relative to the bottom row of bolts) to the "straight-across" pattern that remained the way of identifying the early heads from the newer ones with a valve cover design which lasted until the 1987 center-bolt-style covers.
1962 – The block's cylinder wall casting was revised to allow four-inch bores, and the 327-cubic-inch version of the engine, using this bore diameter and increased stroke, was introduced.
1967 - The oil filter mounting now came from the factory with an adapter and machining to allow the use of spin-on filters; canister mounting was possible by removing the adapter.
1968 – The main-journal diameter was increased from 2.30" (small) to 2.45" (medium), and the connecting-rod journal diameter was increased from 2.00" to 2.10". This allowed the use of cast-iron crankshafts; the previous crankshafts were made of forged steel, which was more expensive. The rod bolts were changed from 11/32" diameter to 3/8". The oil-fill location was moved from a tube on the front of the intake manifold to a cap on the left- or right-side valve cover, depending upon the application.
1970 - The "400" is introduced in September 1969 for the 1970 model year, with a bore of 4.125" and a stroke of 3.75".  This engine introduced the "large-journal" crankshaft with a main journal size of 2.65" and rod bearing journals of 2.10".  This engine also introduced "Siamese bores" to the Chevrolet small-block line, requiring "steam holes" in the cylinder heads and head gaskets, which were used to prevent hot spots and subsequent overheating.  The connecting rods, due to the long stroke, are also shorter at 5.565", differing from the 5.7" length of all other Generation I small-block connecting rods.
1980 – Weight reduction though thinner cylinder wall block and light weight head castings.  Heads are prone to cracking and blocks typically cannot tolerate an overbore more than .040".
1986 – The rear main seal was changed from a 2-piece rubber design to a 1-piece rubber design that used a mounting appliance to hold it in place. This necessitated a change in the flywheel/flexplate bolt pattern as well as requiring an externally balanced flexplate/flywheel.
1987 – The valve cover surfaces were changed so that the mounting lip was raised and the bolt location was moved from 4 bolts on the perimeter to 4 bolts along the centerline of the valve covers (this design debuted on the Corvette in 1986, and the Chevrolet 4.3L 90 degree V6 the year before).  Also changed were the mounting angles of the two center bolts on each side of the intake manifold (from 90 to 73 degrees), and the lifter bosses were increased in height to accept roller lifters; the aluminum-alloy heads for use on the Corvette engines retained the non-angled bolts. Also, all carburetors(except some 1987-89 F-body and B-body models, also the 30 and 3500 model 1-ton trucks through 1989 with either the M-code 350 or W-code 454 engines, in which all retained the 4bbl rochester E4ME carbs) were replaced by TBI (throttle-body injection) fuel injection.
1996 – The cylinder heads were redesigned, using improved ports and combustion chambers similar to those in the Generation II LT1, resulting in significant power increases. The intake manifold bolt pattern was also changed to four bolts per cylinder head instead of the "traditional" six bolts. The cylinder block timing cover lip was thickened for use with the plastic timing cover (redesigned for use with a crankshaft position sensor with integrated dowel pins - cylinder blocks for 1996+ do not have dowel pins in the timing cover flange) held with 8 bolts and the water pump bypass hole on the RH deck and below the water pump passage undrilled. Also the fuel pump boss is still present but undrilled (which dates back to the 1992 model year for production engines without a fuel pump blockoff plate - some marine/industrial blocks and crate motors sold over the counter via GM dealerships e.g. Goodwrench, ZZ6, 350 H.O. retain the use of a mechanical fuel pump).

This was the last change for the Generation I engine, which continued through the end of the production run in 2003; all 1997–2003 Generation I engines were "Vortec" truck engines.

Details  

Chevrolet Generation I V8 Small Block Engine Table
note 1: depending upon vehicle application; horsepower, torque, and fuel requirements will vary.

Generation II GM small-block (1992–1997)

General Motors' Generation II LT1 is a small block V8 engine. Making its debut in the 1992 Chevrolet Corvette, the new LT1 sought to draw upon the heritage of the 1970 Chevrolet LT-1.

A significant improvement over the original Generation I V8 is the Generation II LT1's "reverse cooling" system, allowing coolant to start at the heads and flow down through the block. This keeps the heads cooler, affording greater power through a higher compression ratio and greater spark advance at the same time it maintains higher and more consistent cylinder temperatures.

Some parts from the Generation II are interchangeable with the Generation I one-piece rear main seal engine. The interchangeable parts include the rotating assembly (crank shaft, pistons, connecting rods, and flywheel/flexplate) one piece rear main seal housing, oil pan and valve cover gaskets and valvetrain assembly (not including timing set, which includes a gear to drive the water pump). The LT1 uses a new engine block, cylinder head, timing cover, water pump, intake manifold and accessory brackets.  The harmonic damper also does not interchange; it is a unique damper/pulley assembly. Engine mounts and bell housing bolt pattern remain the same, permitting a newer engine to be readily swapped into an older vehicle.

4.00 in bore blocks

5.7 L

LT1

In 1991, GM created a new-generation small-block engine called the "LT1 350", distinct from the high-output Generation I LT-1 of the 1970s. It displaced , and was a 2-valve pushrod design. The LT1 used a reverse-flow cooling system which cooled the cylinder heads first, maintaining lower combustion chamber temperatures and allowing the engine to run at a higher compression than its immediate predecessors.

This engine was used in:

 Y-body:
 1992–1996 Chevrolet Corvette C4
 F-body:
 1993–1997 Chevrolet Camaro Z28, B4C and SS
 1993–1997 Pontiac Firebird Formula, Trans Am, and Firehawk
 B-body:
 1994-1996 Buick Roadmaster
 1994–1996 Chevrolet Caprice
 1994–1996 Chevrolet Caprice Police Package
 1994–1996 Chevrolet Impala SS
 1994–1996 Chevrolet Caprice Wagon
 1994–1996 Buick Roadmaster Wagon
 D-body:
 1994–1996 Cadillac Fleetwood

There were a few different versions of the LT1. All feature a cast iron block, with aluminum heads in the Y and F bodies, and cast iron heads in the B and D bodies. Corvette blocks had four-bolt main caps, while most other blocks were two-bolt main caps. Block castings remained the same between 2 and 4 bolt mains.

The 92–93 LT1s used speed density fuel management, batch-fire fuel injection and a dedicated Engine Control Module (ECM). In 94 the LT1 switched to a mass airflow sensor and sequential port injection. A new, more capable computer controlled the transmission as well as the engine and got a new name: Powertrain Control Module (PCM). Where the ECM held its calibration information in a replaceable PROM chip, the 94-95 OBD1 PCMs are reprogrammable through the diagnostic port.

The early Optispark distributor had durability problems, and a revised version was introduced on the 1994 B-Bodies and on the 1995 Y and F-Bodies.  Changes include a vacuum port to draw filtered air through the distributor to remove moisture and ozone and a revised drive system which uses an extended dowel pin on the camshaft rather than a separate splined shaft in the camshaft gear.  1996 saw major revisions for OBD-II: a second catalytic converter on the F-body cars, rear oxygen sensors to monitor catalyst efficiency, and a new engine front cover with a crankshaft position sensor. Some OBD-II features had been added to the Corvette starting in 1994 for testing purposes. The 1997 model year Camaro and Firebird were the last year for this engine in a GM production car before it was replaced by the LS1, which was already in the Corvette for 1997.

LT4

The LT4 was the special high-performance version of the new-generation LT1. It featured a slightly more aggressive camshaft profile, 1.6:1 aluminum roller rocker arms, lighter hollow intake valves and liquid-sodium filled exhaust valves, larger fuel injectors, performance crankshaft, higher 10.8:1 compression ratio and high-flow intake manifold (painted red) with extra material above the port available to allow port matching to the raised port LT4 cylinder heads. It was introduced in the 1996 model year, for the last year of the C4 Corvette, and came standard on all manual transmission (ZF 6-speed equipped) C4 Corvettes. The engine was passed down to 1997 SLP Camaros SS and SLP Firehawks with 6-speed manual transmissions.

The LT4 was available on the following vehicles:
 1996 Chevrolet Corvette only when equipped with 6-speed manual transmission (includes all Grand Sports) (Production: 6,359)
 1997 Chevrolet Camaro SLP/LT4 SS 6-speed (Production: 100 for the U.S., 6 for Canada.  There were 2 prototypes)
 1997 Pontiac Firebird SLP/LT4 Firehawk 6-speed (Production: 29)

All 135 production engines for the Firehawks and SSs were completely disassembled, balanced, blueprinted and honed with stress plates. One in 5 engines was tested on a Superflow engine dyno. Every car was tested on a chassis dyno and then performed a  road test.

3.90 in bore blocks

5.7 L

LT5

For model year 1990, Chevrolet released the Corvette ZR-1 with the radical Lotus Engineering-designed double overhead cam LT5 engine.  Engineered in the UK but produced and assembled in Stillwater, Oklahoma by specialty engine builder Mercury Marine, the all-aluminum LT5 shared only the 4.4 inch bore spacing with any previous sbc engine. It does not have reverse cooling and is generally not considered a small block Chevrolet.

Used only in Corvettes, the LT5 was the work of a team headed by Design manager David Whitehead, and was hand built by one headed by project engineer Terry D. Stinson. It displaced  and had a bore x stroke  instead of the usual  and featured Lotus-designed DOHC 4 valves per cylinder rather than the usual Chevrolet 16-Valve OHV Heads.

A second generation of the LT5 was in the testing phase as early as 1993. What little information survived showed that it would have used a dual plenum system similar to the first generation Dodge Viper as well as variable valve timing. Unfortunately, the cost to produce the LT5 along with its weight, dimensions (would not fit the C5 pilot cars without extensive modifications) and internal GM politics over using an engine that was not designed and built in house killed the LT5 after six years of production. GM canceled the ZR-1 option beginning model year 1993. Engines that were to be installed in the as yet unbuilt ZR-1's were sealed and crated for long-term storage. After they were built at the Mercruiser plant in Stillwater, Oklahoma they were shipped to Bowling Green, Kentucky and stored in the Corvette assembly plant until the 1994 and 1995 ZR-1s went down the assembly line. A total of 6,939 cars were produced. The LT5 however wasn't an evolutionary dead end. Despite being discontinued, a new class of premium V8s for Cadillac and eventually Oldsmobile, the dual overhead cam V8 Northstar and its derivatives, drew heavily from the LT5's design and lessons learned from its production. GM also took lessons learned from producing a completely aluminum engine and applied them to the new LS series of engines.

The LT5 was available on the following vehicles:
 1990-1995 Chevrolet Corvette C4 ZR-1 equipped with 6-speed manual transmission (Production: 6,939).  Although the LT5 was never used in another production GM vehicle, it did make its way into several Corvette concepts, race cars and even into a limited run of the Lotus Elise GT1.

3.74 in bore blocks

4.3 L

L99
The pistons used in the 4.3 L V8 were the same as the Vortec 5000's, but longer  connecting rods were used to compensate for the shorter stroke. The L99 featured updated Generation II block architecture, and is externally identical to the larger 5.7 L LT1 Generation II V8. Like the LT1, it features sequential fuel injection, reverse-flow cooling with a cam-driven water pump, and an optical ignition pickup.

The L99 4.3 L V8 was the base engine in 1994-1996 Chevrolet Caprice sedans, including 9C1 police package sedans, and was not available in any other vehicles. The L99's smaller displacement provided slightly better EPA fuel economy than the 5.7 L LT1, but at significantly reduced horsepower and torque levels.

LT6 and LT7

The LT6 and LT7 are not part of the LT family. See Oldsmobile Diesel engine for more information.

See also
Chevrolet 90° V6 engine
GMC V8 engine
GMC V6 engine
Chevrolet Series D V8
GM LS engine – Generation III/IV/V small block
List of GM engines

References

External links 

 Mortec: Small-Block Engine Enthusiasts
 Video : First start up SBC engine (& zoomies flames)
 Video : Let's see Chevy first start up, and what NOT to do ! ("Dark" humor)

Small-Block
V8 engines
Gasoline engines by model
Engines by model